Gannett Building is a historic industrial and commercial building located in Rochester in Monroe County, New York. It is a Classical Revival style structure constructed in 1927, with four major later additions. It was built to house the consolidated offices and newspaper printing facilities for the internationally prominent Gannett Newspapers chain.

One of the building's most visible features is a relief sculpture over the entrance of its east side. It was created by noted Italian sculptor Edmond Amateis. The work's central figure is Truth, guarding the eternal flame of enlightenment. The figures on the left are Fine Arts and Industry. On the right are Law and Agriculture.

History
The five story 1949 addition was designed by Albert Kahn to house the printing presses until the presses were moved to nearby Greece and replaced in 1996. The building was listed on the National Register of Historic Places in 1985. and served as the world headquarters for Gannett until 1986.

The building also formerly housed the local Democrat and Chronicle, one of largest papers in the Gannett chain from 1959 until 2016 as well as fellow original Gannett newspaper and later former sister evening paper The Times-Union from the opening of the building until the paper's demise in 1996.

In 2014 it was announced that Gannett was selling the Gannett building and moving the Democrat and Chronicle to a new building at the corner of Main Street and Clinton Ave on the former Midtown Plaza site. The paper no longer needed the considerable space in the new digital age where newsprint in the United States is on the decline and the building which includes the space that formerly held the presses is expensive to maintain. The Gannett building is currently on the market for sale at an asking price of $3.5 million. The Democrat and Chronicle moved to its new location on May 2, 2016.

Future
The Gannett Building post-Democrat and Chronicle is focused on office use. Developers plan to renovate the building into a full office building for multiple tenants with the added possibility of using the basement and former space that once held the presses as in building parking. The in building parking however that is dependent on the ability to use a portion of the former Rochester Subway which connects with the basement via two doorways formerly used to bring in printing paper for the presses as a vehicle entrance and exit to the in building parking area. The large, open floors make it attractive to tenants. Other possible uses include part residential and part ground floor retail.

External links

 Building history from the Democrat and Chronicle

References

Industrial buildings and structures in Rochester, New York
Office buildings on the National Register of Historic Places in New York (state)
Neoclassical architecture in New York (state)
Office buildings completed in 1927
Industrial buildings completed in 1927
Industrial buildings and structures on the National Register of Historic Places in New York (state)
Gannett
National Register of Historic Places in Rochester, New York